This is a list of the heritage sites in Graaff-Reinet as recognised by the South African Heritage Resources Agency.

|}

References 

Graaff-Reinet
Eastern Cape-related lists
Tourist attractions in the Eastern Cape